The Château du Petit-Ringelstein (or Château du Petit-Ringelsberg) is a ruined castle in the commune of Oberhaslach in the Bas-Rhin département of France. It is sited on a small summit that it surrounds with its enceinte constructed of dry stone walls.

Access 
The ruins can be accessed via the paths provided by the Club Vosgien. They are on an extension of the path leading from Oberhaslach to the Château du Grand Ringelstein.

Toponymy 
The name Petit-Ringelstein is derived from the German words Ring (ring or circle) and Stein (stone).

Ruins 
A dry stone wall circles the hill top, measuring approximately 61m by 21m, with a height of one metre. It is bordered by a ditch.

There is a quarry nearby from which rocks were cut and dressed. They date, probably, from the first third of the 13th century and would have been used for the Château du Grand-Ringelstein and/or the Château de Hohenstein.

History 
Nothing is known of the history of the Petit-Ringelstein. It may have been a primitive form of castle. Its present aspect is probably from a later alteration, perhaps during a siege of the Château de Hohenstein.

It has been listed since 1898 as a monument historique by the French Ministry of Culture, and is state property.

See also 
 Château du Grand Ringelstein, a neighbouring castle
 List of castles in France

External links

Bibliography 
 Charles-Laurent Salch, Nouveau Dictionnaire des Châteaux-Forts d'Alsace, Alsatia 1991.
 Charles-Laurent Salch, "Archéologie du château alsacien", in Châteaux Guerriers, 1975
 Bernard Haegel, "L'enceinte et la carrière de pierres médiévale du Petit-Ringelstein" in Etudes Médiévales, III, 1985

References 

Ruined castles in Bas-Rhin
Monuments historiques of Bas-Rhin